Miandrivazo Airport  is an airport near Miandrivazo, Menabe Region, Madagascar.

References

Airports in Madagascar
Menabe